Ismail Benlamaalem (born 9 April 1988 in Casablanca) is a Moroccan defender who plays as a centre back.

Biography
He was trained at Raja Casablanca and went through the class before joining the pro in 2008, he played his first official game in the jersey of green against the FUS Rabat (1-0 for Raja Casablanca ) and played his first Champions League in 2009 after the Raja Casablanca was the same année. He was also a champion of Morocco in 2011 with the same club Raja Casablanca, he was contacted in October 2011 by the Stade de Reims but the Raja Casablanca refuses to let Benlamaalem join the French club because that sum was not suitable (€90,000).

On 5 August 2016, he officially transferred to IR Tanger, recently promoted to the Botola, for a record deal ($300,000).

National team
He was contacted by the coach selection Moroccan Belgian Eric Gerets two game counting for the qualification of the World 2014 in Brazil.

Honours

Club
 Raja Casablanca
Botola - Champion in 2009 and 2011
Tournament Antifi - Winner in 2010

Country
 Morocco
Arab Cup - Champion in 2012

References

External links
Ismail Belmaalem at Footballdatabase

1988 births
Living people
Moroccan footballers
Footballers from Casablanca
Morocco international footballers
Raja CA players
Baniyas Club players
Al-Wakrah SC players
Qatar SC players
Ittihad Tanger players
AS FAR (football) players
UAE Pro League players
Botola players
Qatar Stars League players
Moroccan expatriate footballers
Expatriate footballers in the United Arab Emirates
Moroccan expatriate sportspeople in the United Arab Emirates
Association football defenders